Borj-e Abbas Khan (also Romanized as Borj-e Abbās Khān and Borj-e ‘Abbās Khān) is a village in Malmir Rural District, Sarband District, Shazand County, Markazi Province, Iran. According to the 2006 census, its population was 28 people in 8 families.

References 

Populated places in Shazand County